Pseudacidalia albicosta is a moth of the family Noctuidae first described by Frederic Moore in 1885. It is found in Sri Lanka.

References

Moths of Asia
Moths described in 1885
Acontiinae